Tulfo is a Filipino surname that may refer to:
Ben Tulfo (born 1955), Filipino TV and radio personality
Erwin Tulfo (born 1964), Filipino news anchor and radio commentator
Raffy Tulfo (born 1960), Filipino broadcast journalist and senator since 2022
Ramon Tulfo (born 1946), Filipino TV host, radio broadcaster and columnist
Wanda Tulfo Teo (born 1952), Filipino travel agent 
Jocelyn Tulfo (born 1960), Filipino politician and wife of Raffy Tulfo

See also
Tutok Tulfo, Philippine investigative news show